Bhavanipuram is a residential hub located to the West Central of Vijayawada in Andhra Pradesh The locality shares its borders with Vijayawada Bypass Road and the National Highway 65. Though consisting of vacant plots till a few years back, the area is now bustling with some commercial and residential establishments. Popular areas located close to Bhavanipuram include Undavalli, Krishna Lanka, Gollapudi, Jakkampudi, Vidyadarapuram, Chitti Nagar, and Kabela.

History
Until the early 1990s, the area mostly consisted of vacant plots, Estates and roadside restaurants to serve the traffic along NH9 to Bombay. Commercial activity first shifted here from the center of the city in the 1990s with the expansion of the western suburbs of Vijayawada due to ongoing construction activity in the area and its surrounding areas. Today it is a bustling locality with several commercial establishments along with high pedestrian and vehicular traffic.

References

Neighbourhoods in Vijayawada